Whatever's Got You Down is the seventh album from the American band Samiam. It was released in 2006 on Hopeless Records and Burning Heart Records. It was the band's first album after a six-year hiatus.

Track listing

Personnel
Sean Kennerly - guitar
Jeremy Bergo - bass
Johnny Cruz - drums
Jason Beebout - vocals
Sergie Loobkoff - guitar

References

2006 albums
2013 albums
Samiam albums
Hopeless Records albums
Burning Heart Records albums
No Idea Records albums